Omar Rebahi (born 2 September 1978) is an Algerian judoka.

Achievements

References

1978 births
Living people
Algerian male judoka
Judoka at the 2000 Summer Olympics
Judoka at the 2004 Summer Olympics
Judoka at the 2008 Summer Olympics
Olympic judoka of Algeria
African Games gold medalists for Algeria
African Games medalists in judo
Mediterranean Games gold medalists for Algeria
Mediterranean Games medalists in judo
Competitors at the 1999 All-Africa Games
Competitors at the 2007 All-Africa Games
Competitors at the 2005 Mediterranean Games
21st-century Algerian people
20th-century Algerian people